John McCaffery (November 30, 1913–October 3, 1983), also known as John K. M. McCaffery, was an American television host who appeared on many game shows and talk shows during the 1940s and 1950s including Americana, Television Screen Magazine, What's the Story, One Minute Please, and Author Meets the Critics.

McCaffery was best known as anchorman of what was called The eleventh Hour News.

Game Shows
McCaffery also hosted the following game shows:
 We Take Your Word (CBS Radio - January 29 to April, 1950; CBS primetime - March 9 to June 1, 1951; replaced by John Daly during the rest of the run)
 Information Please (CBS primetime - August 24 to September 21, 1952; replaced Clifton Fadiman)
 Take a Guess (CBS primetime - June 11 to September 10, 1953)
 What's the Story (DuMont primetime - Fall 1953 to September 23, 1955)
 One Minute Please (DuMont primetime - July 6 to November 12, 1954; replaced by Allyn Edwards)

Final Series and Death
His last series was Alumni Fun, a primetime game which he hosted from January 20 to April 28, 1963 on ABC.

McCaffery died on October 3, 1983, at the age of 69.

References

1913 births

1983 deaths

American game show hosts